Jomer Raja Dilo Bor (Bengali: যমের রাজা দিল বর) is a Bengali Film  starring Abir Chatterjee & Payel Sarkar in lead roles. The film is a surreal romantic comedy directed by Abir Sengupta. Previously Raima Sen was roped in for the project but later Payel Sarkar replaced her. Anupam Roy is doing the Music for this film.

Synopsis
Ria Bannerjee Payel Sarkar is an author who hates men from the core of her heart. She thinks that men only have a body, they don’t have a soul. For obvious reasons she doesn’t want to get married, but destiny makes her meet the ultimate Mr. Right called Deb Das which is played by Abir Chatterjee.

They have a perfect marriage. But, fate has other plans for her. On the very first morning after her marriage, Ria finds her husband Deb dead! Destiny’s plans do not end here. She soon finds her way to Yamlok and is now face to face with Yamraj to get her husband back from the God of death Himself! But the bor or boon that the Yamraj gives to Ria changes her and Deb’s life forever!In the end they get together afterall.
Some new artists like Ujjal Mohanta ( Martial Arts & Fitness Expert ) also found in the movie.

Cast

Payel Sarkar as Ria Banerjee
Abir Chatterjee as Deb Das
Rajatava Dutta as Yamraj 1
Kharaj Mukherjee as Yamraj 2
Laboni Sarkar as Indrani Banerjee
Arindam Sil as Manohar Gyandas Pandey aka M.G Pandey
Debleena Dutta as Jhumpa
Sanjay Biswas
Sumit Sammadar
Subhasish Banerjee
Arunava Dutta as Chitragupta
Anisha Mandal
Ujjal Mohanta

Soundtrack

Reception

References

External links
 
Official trailer on YouTube
Official Facebook Page on Facebook

Bengali-language Indian films
2010s Bengali-language films
2015 films
Films scored by Anupam Roy